Berrien County is a county located in the south central portion of the U.S. state of Georgia. As of the 2020 census, the population was 18,160. The county seat is Nashville. The county was created  February 25, 1856 out of portions of Coffee, Irwin and Lowndes Counties by an act of the Georgia General Assembly.  It is named after Georgia senator John M. Berrien.

History

Establishment
The citizens of the area of Lowndes County and Irwin County that would become Berrien County had to travel long distances to get the county courthouse at Franklinville, Georgia and later Troupville, Georgia for those in Lowndes County, and Irwinville, Georgia for those in Irwin County. By at least June 1853, citizens had petitioned to form a new county. The 1853 attempt of a new county failed. By 1856, a renewed attempt at the creation of a new county was successful.

World War I
Berrien County lost a disproportionate number of men in World War I in part because companies at that time were organized by militia districts at home.  Eight weeks before the Armistice, 25 Berrien County men were among the 200 recently enlisted soldiers who perished at sea off the coast of Scotland.  Many of the bodies were returned to the soldiers' hometowns for burial, and the names of the dead were engraved on a memorial located on the courthouse grounds in Nashville.  The memorial was the first in a series of pressed copper sculptures by artist E. M. Viquesney entitled The Spirit of the American Doughboy.

Geography

The western portion of Berrien County, from just north of U.S. Route 82 and roughly west of U.S. Route 129 heading south, is located in the Withlacoochee River sub-basin of the Suwannee River basin. The eastern portion of the county is located in the Alapaha River sub-basin of the larger Suwannee River basin.

Major highways

  U.S. Route 82
  U.S. Route 129
  State Route 11
  State Route 37
  State Route 64
  State Route 76
  State Route 125
  State Route 135
  State Route 158
  State Route 168
  State Route 520

Adjacent counties
 Irwin County - north
 Coffee County - northeast
 Atkinson County - east
 Lanier County - southeast
 Lowndes County - south
 Cook County - west
 Tift County - northwest

Demographics

2000 census
As of the census of 2000, there were 16,235 people, 6,261 households, and 4,539 families living in the county. The population density was 36 people per square mile (14/km2). There were 7,100 housing units at an average density of 16 per square mile (6/km2). The racial makeup of the county was 85.48% White, 11.43% Black or African American, 0.26% Native American, 0.30% Asian, 0.08% Pacific Islander, 1.53% from other races, and 0.92% from two or more races. 2.37% of the population were Hispanic or Latino of any race.

There were 6,261 households, out of which 34.90% had children under the age of 18 living with them, 56.20% were married couples living together, 11.70% had a female householder with no husband present, and 27.50% were non-families. 23.60% of all households were made up of individuals, and 10.00% had someone living alone who was 65 years of age or older. The average household size was 2.57 and the average family size was 3.03.

In the county, the population was spread out, with 27.20% under the age of 18, 8.60% from 18 to 24, 28.70% from 25 to 44, 22.90% from 45 to 64, and 12.50% who were 65 years of age or older. The median age was 35 years. For every 100 females there were 96.50 males. For every 100 females age 18 and over, there were 92.80 males.

The median income for a household in the county was $30,044, and the median income for a family was $34,643. Males had a median income of $25,559 versus $19,790 for females. The per capita income for the county was $16,375. About 14.60% of families and 17.70% of the population were below the poverty line, including 25.40% of those under age 18 and 13.00% of those age 65 or over.

2010 census
As of the 2010 United States Census, there were 19,286 people, 7,443 households, and 5,254 families living in the county. The racial makeup of the county was 84.7% white, 10.7% black or African American, 0.4% Asian, 0.3% American Indian, 2.6% from other races, and 1.3% from two or more races. Those of Hispanic or Latino origin made up 4.6% of the population. In terms of ancestry, 28.8% were American, 14.4% were Irish, 8.2% were English, and 6.6% were German.

Of the 7,443 households, 35.5% had children under the age of 18 living with them, 51.5% were married couples living together, 13.6% had a female householder with no husband present, 29.4% were non-families, and 25.2% of all households were made up of individuals. The average household size was 2.57 and the average family size was 3.05. The median age was 38.0 years.

The median income for a household in the county was $32,202 and the median income for a family was $40,869. Males had a median income of $30,847 versus $22,277 for females. The per capita income for the county was $16,049. About 18.2% of families and 23.1% of the population were below the poverty line, including 32.8% of those under age 18 and 17.1% of those age 65 or over.

2020 census

As of the 2020 United States census, there were 18,160 people, 7,367 households, and 5,055 families residing in the county.

Historical notes
Berrien Historical Foundation maintains Berrien Historical Photos website.

Communities

Cities
 Nashville
 Ray City

Towns
 Alapaha
 Enigma

Unincorporated communities
 Bannockburn
 Glory

Politics

See also

 National Register of Historic Places listings in Berrien County, Georgia
List of counties in Georgia

References

External links
 Official website
 Berrien County historical marker

 
1856 establishments in Georgia (U.S. state)
Georgia (U.S. state) counties
Populated places established in 1856